Islaja or Merja Kokkonen (born 19 May 1979) is a singer-songwriter and musician from Helsinki, Finland. Besides her solo career, she is a member of free improv and psychedelic folk bands Avarus, Kemialliset Ystävät, and the trio Hertta Lussu Ässä.

She has been compared to Björk, Syd Barrett, and Nico.

Her music is psychedelic and intimate using a large variety of instruments. She is a multi-instrumentalist.

As of 2017, she is based in Berlin.

Discography 
 Meritie (Fonal, 2004)
 Palaa aurinkoon (Fonal, 2005)
 Ulual Yyy (Fonal, 2007)
 Blaze Mountain Recordings (Ecstatic Peace, 2008)
 Keraaminen Pää (Fonal, 2010)
 S U U (Monika Enterprise, 2014)
 Tarrantulla (Svart Records, 2017)

Also appears on
Beginner's Guide to Scandinavia (3CD, Nascente 2011)

Images

References

External links

Islaja site
Fonal Records
Interview, Drowned in Sound, 22 September 2008 

1979 births
Living people
21st-century Finnish women singers
Finnish songwriters
Musicians from Helsinki
Psychedelic folk musicians
Women in electronic music
Writers from Helsinki